Gaetano Bresci (11 November 186922 May 1901) was an Italian anarchist who assassinated King Umberto I of Italy. A weaver by trade, Bresci was radicalised to anarchism at a young age, due to his experiences in poverty. He emigrated to Paterson, New Jersey, where he became involved with other Italian immigrant anarchists, before news of the Bava Beccaris massacre motivated him to return to Italy. There, he assassinated Umberto and was sentenced to life imprisonment, although he would be found dead of an apparent suicide within the year.

Biography

Early life
On 11 November 1869, Gaetano Bresci was born into a lower middle class family, in Prato, Tuscany, where he worked as a silk weaver. 

He became radicalised by his experiences in the workplace and joined the Italian anarchist movement at the age of 15. After being arrested and falling under police surveillance for his political dissidence, in 1895, he was exiled to Lampedusa by the government of Francesco Crispi. In prison, Bresci studied anarchist literature and became radicalised even further by the experience.

Bresci was granted amnesty in 1896 and returned to Italy, where he went back to work in a wool factory. During his time there, he developed a reputation as a dandy and engaged in numerous affairs, possibly fathering a child with one of his co-workers.

Emigration
In 1897, Bresci emigrated to the United States. From New York, Bresci moved to Hoboken, New Jersey, where he met Sophie Kneiland, an Irish-American with whom he fathered two daughters: Madeleine and Gaetanina. To support his family, Bresci spent his weekdays working as a silk weaver in Paterson, returning to Hoboken on weekends.

In Paterson, Bresci quickly became involved in the local trade unions and the immigrant anarchist movement, regularly attending meetings. As a member of the Right to Existence Group, Bresci co-founded the newspaper La Questione Sociale, which he financially supported and contributed to its publication as a prolific "firebrand". At one of the group's meetings, Bresci reportedly saved the life of Errico Malatesta, when he disarmed a disgruntled individualist anarchist that had attempted to murder the old anarchist. But Bresci ended up leaving the Right to Existence after a few months, as he considered it to be insufficiently radical.

Assassination

After receiving news of the Bava Beccaris massacre, Bresci swore revenge against the "murderer king" Umberto I of Italy. With money from La Questione Sociale, he bought a .38 caliber revolver and a one-way ticket back to Italy, informing his wife that he was returning in order to take care of family business.

Bresci was accompanied on his journey by a number of other Italian anarchists. Upon arriving in Le Havre, he and his travelling companions continued on to Paris, where they stayed for a week before finally making for Italy. In June 1900, Bresci returned to his home city of Prato, where he stayed with his brother's family. Although the local police chief was aware of his presence and knew of Bresci as a "dangerous anarchist", he failed to inform the interior ministry or confiscate his passport, leaving Bresci to freely practise firing his revolver on a daily basis. 

The following month, he visited his sister in Castel San Pietro Terme, before moving on to Milan. On 25 July, he met his friend Luigi Granotti, with whom he saw the sights of Milan before travelling to Monza. Here, Bresci learnt that the King of Italy was due to attend a gymnastics competition, while staying at the local Royal Villa. Bresci found a room near the Monza train station and waited to strike. For two days, he scouted the area and inquired for information about the king's activities. 

After preparing his weapon and thoroughly grooming himself, in the morning of 29 July 1900, Bresci left his hotel intent on assassinating the king at the conclusion of the contest. He spent most of the day walking around town and eating ice cream, briefly stopping for lunch with a stranger, who he told "Look at me carefully, because you will perhaps remember me for the rest of your life." That evening at 21:30, Umberto began on his largely-unguarded route to the stadium, where he was to hand out medals to the competition's athletes at 22:00. 

Bresci had positioned himself along the road that led out of the stadium, in order to give himself a chance at escape, but the excited crowd swept him within three meters of the king's car and blocked his own way out. In amongst the crowd, Bresci drew his revolver and shot Umberto. As the king lay dying, Bresci was accosted by the now angry crowd, but was arrested by Andrea Braggio before he could be lynched. He accepted arrest without resistance, declaring: "I did not kill Umberto. I have killed the King. I killed a principle."

Trial and death

A month after the assassination, Bresci's trial was held on 30 August 1900. At his trial, Bresci was defended by Francesco Saverio Merlino, who argued that the idolisation of kings had weakened Italy and that the criminalisation of the anarchist movement had directly led to Umberto's assassination. He then proposed that the decriminalization of radical ideologies and the resumption of civil liberties would be an end to the anarchist "propaganda of the deed". His character was further defended by his old foreman, a long-time co-worker, and his own wife, who herself expressed surprise that her husband could have committed the assassination. Examinations by Cesare Lombroso found no evidence of mental illness, which meant that the prosecution was unable to establish criminal insanity.

Nevertheless, Bresci was swiftly convicted of murder and sentenced to life imprisonment, the most severe punishment available, as Italy had already abolished the death penalty. He was held in solitary confinement on Santo Stefano Island, in a small, unfurnished cell, with his feet clamped in shackles.

Meanwhile, the interior minister Giovanni Giolitti had become obsessed with the Bresci case. He was convinced that the assassination had been plotted by Paterson anarchists, including Errico Malatesta, together with the exiled Neapolitan Queen Maria Sofia, who he alleged was planning to return to power in Italy. But despite attempts by the Italian government to prove that the Paterson anarchists had ordered Bresci to assassinate the king, the Supreme Court of New Jersey found no evidence of such a plot. Giolitti then claimed that the conspirators were planning to break Bresci out of prison on 18 May 1901. 

On 22 May 1901, Gaetano Bresci was found hanging by the neck in his cell. The word "Vengeance" had been carved into the wall. The circumstances of Bresci's death aroused suspicion, with many contesting whether his death was truly a suicide.

Legacy 

Bresci's assassination of Umberto quickly became a cornerstone of the Italian left-wing counterculture, while anarchists came to regard Bresci himself as a martyr. On Italian anarchist postcards, Bresci's face was superimposed onto the Statue of Liberty, while his deeds were eulogised in a poem by Voltairine de Cleyre and in Italian revolutionary music. One Roman Catholic priest was imprisoned for declaring his support for Bresci's actions, which he characterised as "an instrument of divine vengeance against a dynasty that has deprived the Popes of their temporal power." On the anniversary of the assassination, the socialist activist Benito Mussolini praised Bresci in the pages of Lotta di Classe. Bresci's actions were also admired by Luigi Lucheni, who himself had assassinated Empress Elisabeth of Austria a few years prior.

When an Italian monarchist newspaper L'Araldo Italiano raised one thousand dollars for a decoration for Umberto's tomb, the Paterson anarchists responded by quickly raising the same amount to support his widow and two daughters, despite police harassment of their fundraising events. After Bresci's regicide inspired the anarchist Leon Czolgosz to assassinate United States President William McKinley later that year, Bresci's family was forced to flee their home in Cliffside Park, due to mounting public pressure and police surveillance. 

Anarchists in New York City formed the Bresci Circle in his honor. By 1914, the group had reached 600 members, who met frequently in East Harlem's 106th Street. That year, members of the Bresci group were implicated in a plot to assassinate John D. Rockefeller, the richest person of the fin de siècle era. The following year, the group was infiltrated by an undercover operation and two of its members were convicted of plotting to bomb St. Patrick's Cathedral in Manhattan.

In 1976, a street in Bresci's home town of Prato was named after him. During the 1980s, Tuscan anarchists commissioned a monument to Bresci for his hometown but were blocked by the government. It was erected overnight in Carrara's  in 1990. Vittorio Emanuele III commissioned the Expiatory Chapel of Monza to commemorate the place where his father was assassinated.

In 2021, an Italian darkwave duo named itself GBRESCI after Bresci.

See also
List of unsolved deaths

References

Bibliography

Further reading 

 
 
 
 
 
 
 

19th-century Italian criminals
1869 births
1901 deaths
1901 suicides
Anarchist assassins
Italian anarchists
Italian assassins
Italian emigrants to the United States
Italian prisoners sentenced to life imprisonment
Italian people convicted of murder
Italian people who died in prison custody
Italian regicides
Italian revolutionaries
People convicted of murder by Italy
People from Paterson, New Jersey
People from the Province of Prato
Prisoners sentenced to life imprisonment by Italy
Prisoners who died in Italian detention
Regicides
Unsolved deaths
Murdered anarchists
Death conspiracy theories